The Nobel Banquet is an annual banquet held on 10 December in the Blue Hall of Stockholm City Hall, after the Nobel Prize ceremony. At the banquet, for which a formal dress code exists, a multi-course dinner is served and entertainment provided. After the dinner, a dance is held in the Golden Hall. The event is broadcast live on Sveriges Television and Sveriges Radio, and abroad with generally high ratings.

History

The first banquet, for 113 male guests, was held in 1901 and until 1923 it was known as the Nobel Dinner. Until 1930 the banquet was held in Vinterträdgården at Stockholm's Grand Hôtel Royal, and it has also been held in the Golden Hall of the Swedish Academy (Svenska Akademien).

The banquet hosts 1,300 guests (including the Swedish Royal Family) and 200 students. Its host, the chair of the Nobel Foundation, is always seated at the royal table.

During the dinner (usually four hours long) each Nobel Prize recipient makes a speech, often lighthearted in character. There are two ceremonial toasts: the Loyal toast to the Swedish monarch and the other, made by the monarch, in memory of Alfred Nobel. The speeches and toasts are presented by the banquet's toastmaster, traditionally a Swedish student who holds the job for four years.

Service during the banquet is provided by waiting staff, chefs, and others who are trained for several weeks. Since the 1970s, flowers for the banquet have been provided by the Italian city of Sanremo (where Nobel lived during his final years). They are grown in the province of Imperia in the Liguria region of Italy.

In late July 2020, it was revealed that the banquet would be cancelled for that year due to the COVID-19 pandemic. This was the first time the banquet was cancelled since 1956.  
In September 2021, it was announced that the banquet of 2021 will also be postponed, again due to the pandemic. In 2022, the banquet will return after a two-year break. For 2022, the ambassadors to Sweden from Belarus, Russia and Iran would not be invited to join the banquet.

Dress code
The dinner is a formal affair, and for men the dress code is white tie, and orders and decorations should be worn.

See also
List of dining events

References

External links

Annual events in Sweden
Ceremonies in Sweden
Culture in Stockholm
December events
Dining events
Events in Stockholm
High society (social class)
Recurring events established in 1901
Winter events in Sweden
Balls (dance party)